PXO may refer to:

Prospective Executive Officer, in Prospective Commanding Officer
Professor X the Overseer, a hip-hop musician
IATA airport code for Porto Santo Airport
Parallax Online, a provider of free services over the internet in FreeSpace 2
Public Works Department in List of U.S. Navy acronyms
Patient Experience Officer